Eas Maol Mhairi is a waterfall of Scotland.
Just east of this waterfall is the River Cannich.

See also
Waterfalls of Scotland

References

Waterfalls of Highland (council area)